Roslyn Elementary School, located in Westmount, Quebec, Canada, is a coeducational public school for children between kindergarten and grade six. The school opened in September 1908 and is currently operated by the English Montreal School Board (EMSB). Roslyn offers bilingual education in English and French; the school introduced its French Immersion Program in 1968, the first on the island of Montreal. Classrooms are equipped with a SMARTboard. In September 2014, the school opened its new technology lab with seed funding from a 2013-14 Future Shop Future Generation Tech Lab Grant and partly funded by the Roslyn Home and School Association.

History

Roslyn Elementary School was the fourth public elementary school to open in Westmount following Westmount Academy (later Argyle School; built in 1895), King's School (built in 1986), and Queen's School (built in 1900). The cornerstone of Roslyn Elementary School (originally named Roslyn Avenue School) was laid on October 11, 1907.

In September 1908 (the same year the Town of Westmount officially incorporated as the City of Westmount), Roslyn Elementary School opened its doors to 264 students and 10 teachers. Stella Winnifred Alice Young was the school's first principal.

The Roslyn Home and School Association's fund raising initiatives in 1960 were pivotal in the creation of the school's library with the purchase of 375 books.

In 1965, three Roslyn Elementary School parents, Charles Burgess, Carol Kahn, and Joan Rothman, initiated what would become Roslyn's French Immersion Program. It launched in 1968 with the assistance of the Roslyn Home and School Association and then-principal  Scott Kneeland.

The school celebrated its 100th anniversary May 30–31, 2008. Centennial events were coordinated by Roslyn School Foundation. A stepping stone pathway featuring the names of donors to the Roslyn School Playground Improvement Fund was unveiled as part of the centennial festivities on October 11, 2007, and a new playground was opened on May 30, 2008.

Building
 Key members from the City of Westmount community who were instrumental in the planning, procurement, design and construction of Roslyn Elementary School included:
 James Kewley Ward  Chairman, Westmount School Commissioners; former Mayor of Village of Notre-Dame-de-Grace (later known as Village of Cote-St. Antoine, subsequently the Town of Westmount until incorporation as the City of Westmount) 
 William Gailbraith  Mayor of Westmount 
 William Douw Lighthall  Mayor of Westmount (1900-1903)
 Thomas Harling  School Commissioner, procurement of land
 John Stewart  Building contractor
 George Allen Ross  Architect (firm Ross and MacFarlane, later Ross and MacDonald)

Notable alumni/alumnae
 Sylvan Adams  Real estate executive former CEO of Iberville Developments.
 Paul Almond  Television and motion picture screenwriter, director, producer and novelist most noted for his iconic documentary series Seven Up. 
 Jay Baruchel  Actor and comedian who has starred in such films as The Sorcerer's Apprentice, How to Train Your Dragon.
 Bill Brownstein  Author and columnist.
 Warren Chippindale  Member of the Order of Canada, fundraising for many institutions including McGill University and the Montreal Neurological Institute.
 Leonard Cohen  Singer-songwriter, musician, poet, novelist and Companion of the Order of Canada.
 David H. Levy  Astronomer and science writer who co-discovered Comet Shoemaker-Levy 9 in 1993, which collided with Jupiter in July 1994.
 Shawn Levy  Canadian-American director, producer, who directed films including Cheaper by the Dozen, The Pink Panther, and Night at the Museum, Real Steel.
 Michael D. Penner  Businessman.
 Marian Scott  Journalist at the Montreal Gazette.
 Norma Shearer  Actress in North America from the mid-1920s through the 1930s.
 A. J. M. Smith  Poet and anthologist.

References

External links
 Official Rosyln Elementary School website
 Roslyn Home and School association HandS
 Roslyn School Foundation/Fondation de l'école Roslyn

English-language schools in Quebec
Elementary schools in Quebec
Elementary schools in Montreal
Schools in Westmount, Quebec
Education in Westmount, Quebec
Educational institutions established in 1908
1908 establishments in Quebec
Buildings and structures in Westmount, Quebec